Risbecia is a genus of colorful sea slugs, dorid nudibranchs, shell-less marine gastropod mollusks in the family Chromodorididae.

In 2012, the genus Risbecia became a synonym of Hypselodoris Stimpson, 1855

Species
The following species in the genus Risbecia have not been reallocated yet (June 2012):    
 Risbecia nyalya (Ev. Marcus & Er. Marcus, 1967)
 Risbecia versicolor (Risbec, 1828)
 Species brought into synonymy
 Risbecia apolegma Yonow, 2001: synonym of Hypselodoris apolegma (Yonow, 2001)
 Risbecia bullockii (Collingwood, 1881): synonym of Hypselodoris bullockii (Collingwood, 1881)
 Risbecia francoisi Odhner, 1934: synonym of Risbecia tryoni (Garrett, 1873)
 Risbecia ghardaqana  (Gohar & Aboul-Ela, 1957): synonym of Hypselodoris ghardaqana (Gohar & Aboul-Ela, 1957)
 Risbecia godeffroyana  (Bergh, 1877): synonym of Hypselodoris godeffroyana (Bergh, 1877)
 Risbecia imperialis  (Pease, 1860): synonym of Hypselodoris imperialis (Pease, 1860)
 Risbecia odhneri Risbec, 1953: synonym of Risbecia tryoni (Garrett, 1873)
 Risbecia pulchella  (Ruppell & Leuckart, 1828): synonym of Hypselodoris pulchella (Rüppell & Leuckart, 1828)
 Risbecia reticulata (Quoy & Gaimard, 1832): synonym of Chromodoris reticulata (Quoy & Gaimard, 1832)
 Risbecia tryoni  (Garrett, 1873): synonym of Hypselodoris tryoni (Garrett, 1873)

References

 Franc A. (1968) Sous-classe des Opisthobranches. In: P. Grasse (Ed). Traite de Zoologie 5 (3): 608–893. page(s): 866
 Rudman W.B. (1984) The Chromodorididae (Opisthobranchia: Mollusca) of the Indo-West Pacific: a review of the genera. Zoological Journal of the Linnean Society 81 (2/3): 115–273. page(s): 195

Chromodorididae
Gastropod genera